The 1896 United States presidential election in West Virginia took place on November 3, 1896. All contemporary 45 states were part of the 1896 United States presidential election. West Virginia voters chose six electors to the Electoral College, which selected the president and vice president.

 West Virginia was won by the Republican nominees, former Ohio Governor William McKinley and his running mate Garret Hobart of New Jersey. This was the first time the Republicans had carried West Virginia since Ulysses S. Grant in 1872. McKinley’s win resulted substantially from the fact that workers in West Virginia’s growing coal industry opposed Bryan’s free silver policy  because it would cause inflation.

Results

Results by county

Notes

References

West Virginia
1896
1896 West Virginia elections